By the Way, I Forgive You is the sixth studio album by Brandi Carlile, released on February 16, 2018. "The Joke" was released as the album's lead single. The album was co-produced by Dave Cobb and Shooter Jennings. The album art is an original painting by Scott Avett. The album won a Grammy Award for Best Americana Album in 2019, as well being nominated for Album of the Year.

Promotion

Singles
The album's lead single, "The Joke", was released on November 13, 2017. Of the track, Carlile said, "There are so many people feeling misrepresented [today]...so many people feeling unloved. Boys feeling marginalized and forced into these kind of awkward shapes of masculinity that they do or don't belong in... so many men and boys are trans or disabled or shy. Little girls who got so excited for the last election, and are dealing with the fallout. The song is just for people that feel under-represented, unloved or illegal." The official music video for the track was released on February 16, 2018, the same day By the Way, I Forgive You dropped. Former U.S. President Barack Obama named the track as one of his favorites of 2017. "The Joke" later reached number 4 on the Adult Alternative Songs chart  and 43 on the Hot Rock Songs chart.

A remix of "Party of One" featuring English singer-songwriter Sam Smith was released as the second single on October 17, 2018. Upon release, it was announced that a portion of the profits from the song would benefit Children In Conflict, a non-profit that aids children affected by war. The song reached number 29 on the Adult Contemporary radio chart. A music video of the album version starring Elisabeth Moss was released in December 2018.

Television and radio performances
Carlile appeared on television multiple times to promote the album and its singles. In January 2018, Carlile performed "The Joke" on Jimmy Kimmel Live!. In April, she performed "The Joke" and "Whatever You Do" on The Late Show with Stephen Colbert and "The Joke" on The Howard Stern Show. In August, she performed "Hold Out Your Hand" on Full Frontal with Samantha Bee.

Composition
"The Mother" commemorates Carlile's daughter.

Critical reception

By the Way, I Forgive You received positive reviews from music critics. At Metacritic, which assigns a normalized rating out of 100 to reviews from mainstream critics, the album has an average score of 81 out of 100, which indicates "Universal acclaim" based on ten reviews.

Rolling Stone referred to "Party of One" as a "delicate masterpiece". Rolling Stone also rated the entire album as the 12th best of 2018 on its list of the 50 best albums of 2018.

NPR rated the album as the 19th best of 2018. Thrillist rated the album as the 36th best of 2018. Vice rated it as the 22nd best album of 2018. PopMatters rated it as the 63rd best album of the year. Refinery29 rated it as the 9th best album. Entertainment Weekly rated By the Way, I Forgive You as the 11th best album of 2018. Chris Willman of Variety rated the album as the 2nd best of 2018. Kevin Coffey of the Omaha World-Herald also rated it as the 2nd best of the year.

Accolades

Track listing

Personnel

 Brandi Carlile – lead vocals, guitar (tracks 3 through 7, 9), piano (2, 10)
 Tim Hanseroth – guitar (4, 5, 8, 9), electric guitar (2, 3, 6, 7), bass (1)
 Dave Cobb – guitar, high string guitar (4) 
 Shooter Jennings – keyboards (1, 2, 5, 9), piano (1, 5, 6 through 9), organ (2, 6, 7), electric piano and synth (3)
 Phil Hanseroth – bass (2, 3, 4, 5, 7 through 10)
 Chris Powell – drums
 Alicia Enstrom – violin (2)
 David Angell – violin (2)
 Kristin Wilkinson – viola (2) 
 Carole Rabinowitz – cello (2)
 Josh Neumann – cello (2, 8, 9)

Strings arranged by Paul Buckmaster (tracks 5, 10)

Charts

Weekly charts

Year-end charts

References

2018 albums
Albums produced by Dave Cobb
Brandi Carlile albums
Elektra Records albums
Grammy Award for Best Americana Album
Orchestral pop albums